Connemara marble or "Irish green" is a rare variety of marble found in Connemara, Ireland with a distinct green colour. It is commonly used as a gemstone and for decorations. Due to its colouration, it is commonly associated with the Irish identity. It strongly resembles the verd antique found in the Mediterranean. It is named after the region in the western part of the country in which it is quarried (including Lissoughter in Recess, County Galway, and in Clifden).

Geology 

Connemara marble occurs as layers within the Connemara Marble Formation from the lower Dalradian Appin Group, part of the Connemara Metamorphic Complex. The parent rock was an impure siliceous dolomitic limestone deposited in a shelf environment on the continental margin of Laurentia. In the Grampian Orogeny it underwent silimanite grade metamorphism. Minerals formed at this stage were a variety of calc-silicates, including diopside, forsterite, tremolite, together with talc and chlorite. Subsequent metasomatism, probably associated with hydrothermal fluids from the late Caledonian Galway granites, altered the calc-silicates to minerals of the serpentine subgroup. The layers of marble are interbedded with schists and quartzites.

As a marble, the most important mineral components are dolomite and calcite, supplemented with variable amounts of diopside, serpentine, tremolite, forsterite, clinochlore, phlogopite, omphacite and talc.   The colour is determined by the coloured mineral content, with serpentine responsible for the characteristic green colouration.

Connemara marble differs from the verd antiques in that it is an actual marble, rather than a serpentinite breccia, despite also having a very high serpentine content.

Uses 
Connemara marble is used in souvenirs, jewellery and home decoration. It is not suitable for usage in outside construction as it rapidly loses its colouration due to weathering. It has been quarried since the 1700s, and has been exported throughout Europe and America to make columns, floors and other decorations.

See also 
 List of types of marble
 Verd antique, a similar green rock from the Mediterranean.

References 

Connemara
Marble
National symbols of the Republic of Ireland